Dasymalla terminalis, commonly known as native foxglove, is a flowering plant in the mint family Lamiaceae and is endemic to the south-west of Western Australia. It is a shrub with its branches, leaves and some of its flower parts densely covered with white, woolly hairs. The leaves are thick and soft and the flowers are tube-shaped, pale to deep pinkish-purple or claret red.

Description

(A form from near Lake Grace has white flowers.) The flowers are surrounded by woolly bracts and bracteoles which are hairy on the outside but glabrous on the inside. The tube has scattered hairs outside but is glabrous inside except for a ring of hairs near the ovary. The lower petal lobe in more or less circular and almost twice as large as the other four lobes which are roughly equal in size. The four stamens are shorter than the tube with one pair slightly shorter than the other. Flowering occurs from May to November or December, and the hairy fruit which follows, splits into two when mature.

Taxonomy and naming
Dasymalla terminalis was first formally described in 1839 by Stephan Endlicher and the description was published in his book Novarum Stirpium Decades. The specific epithet (terminalis) is a Latin word meaning "of the ends".

Distribution
This species of Dasymalla is the most widely distributed of the genus and grows from near the Murchison River in the north-west to Kalgoorlie in the south-east, in the Avon Wheatbelt, Coolgardie, Esperance Plains, Geraldton Sandplains, Mallee, Murchison and Yalgoo biogeographic regions.

Conservation
Dasymalla terminalis is classified as "not threatened" by the Western Australian Government Department of Parks and Wildlife.

References

terminalis
Plants described in 1839
Flora of Western Australia